Skulpturstopp is a Norwegian public sculpture project initiated and operated by Sparebankstiftelsen DNB. The project operates by inviting artists to choose a location in Eastern Norway and then create a sculpture for the chosen site. Funding for the works is provided by Sparebankstiftelsen DnB.

Collection
 Norwegian Wood Lattice Bisected By Curved 2-way-mirror (2010) by Dan Graham in Vågå
 FLOKK (2011) by Gitte Dæhlin in Sør-Fron
 Mothership with Standing Matter (2011) by Antony Gormley in Lillehammer
 Gripping (2014) by Richard Deacon in Gjøvik
 Allium (2014) by Sverre Wyller in Østre Toten
 HEAD N.N. (2014) by Marianne Heske in Oslo
 Mental Gene Bank (2016) by Per Inge Bjørlo in Dovre
 14–7–2006 (2016) by Kirsten Ortwed in Moss
 Yes to all (2016) by Sylvie Fleury in Skedsmo
 In my faith, in my hope, in my love (2018) by Jaume Plensa in Fredrikstad
The Gran Boathouse (2010) by Rachel Whiteread in Gran.
 Creature from Iddefjord (2020) by Martin Puryear in Oslo
 Broken Thrones (2020) by Camilla Løw in Ullensaker

References

External links
 Official site

Norwegian sculpture